General elections were held in Sweden in September 1908. Right-winger Arvid Lindman stayed on as Prime Minister.

Results
Only 34.7% of the male population aged over 21 was eligible to vote. Voter turnout was 61%, the highest since Riksdag elections began in 1866.

References

Sweden
General
General elections in Sweden
Sweden